Antoine Darquier de Pellepoix (23 November 1718, in Toulouse – 18 January 1802, in Toulouse) was a French astronomer.  He has usually been credited with the discovery of the Ring Nebula in 1779, but in fact he independently rediscovered it upon reading a report of Charles Messier regarding Messier's own observations of Comet Bode.  His description that the object was "...as large as Jupiter and resembles a planet which is fading" led to the terminology "planetary nebula".

References

Jean-Michel Faidit, Darquier et la découverte, à Toulouse, de la nébuleuse de la Lyre. Revue l’Astronomie, juillet-août 2005, pp. 346-53.

External links
 Antoine Darquier de Pellepoix
 Biography

18th-century French astronomers
1718 births
1802 deaths
Scientists from Toulouse